On 6 January 2007, at approximately 1:15pm, in Suwagazi, Comilla District, Bangladesh, a bus carrying between 60 and 100 people on the Dhaka-Chittagong highway ran off the road into a ditch and burst into flames which ignited the fuel tank, which then exploded. It was reported that the bus was attempting to overtake another vehicle.

Over 40 people were killed, though some reports list it as many as 70. Many of the dead were charred beyond recognition, and it is unknown if an accurate number of dead will ever be known.

References

 BBC News
 The Telegraph
 The Daily Star, Bangladesh
 Malaysia Sun
 New Nation, Bangladesh

Bus incidents in Bangladesh
2007 road incidents
Road incidents in Bangladesh
2007 in Bangladesh 
2007 disasters in Bangladesh 
Cumilla District
January 2007 events in Bangladesh